Ernest Lamont Wheelwright, IV (born July 10, 1984) is a former American gridiron football wide receiver . He most recently played for the Saskatchewan Roughriders of the Canadian Football League (CFL). He was signed by the Baltimore Ravens of the National Football League (NFL) as an undrafted free agent in 2008. He played college football at Minnesota. Ernie Wheelwright is one of the most celebrated wide receivers in University of Minnesota  history. From 2004-2007, Wheelwright started 44 of his 49 career games played.  He tied the school record for most consecutive games with a touchdown at a total of seven in 2006-2007. Wheelwright is No. 3 on the Gophers' all-time list for career receptions and career receiving yards. His numbers include 159 receptions along with 2,434 yards and 26 touchdowns. Which is second in school history for receiving touchdowns, also six 100-yard receiving games. Wheelwright was a consistent threat in the Minnesota passing attack in those four years and remains a popular name around the history of the program. Many consider him the fourth or third best wide receiver in school history.

Wheelwright is the grandson of actor and former New Orleans Saints running back Ernie Wheelwright. He is the older brother of Robert Wheelwright, a wide receiver for the University Of Wisconsin-Madison.

References

1984 births
Living people
American football wide receivers
Canadian football wide receivers
Baltimore Ravens players
Minnesota Golden Gophers football players
Saskatchewan Roughriders players
Players of Canadian football from Columbus, Ohio
African-American players of American football
African-American players of Canadian football
Players of American football from Columbus, Ohio
21st-century African-American sportspeople
20th-century African-American people